Melhania volleseniana is a plant in the family Malvaceae, native to East Africa.

Description
The leaves are pubescent above and lanate (woolly) below. The flowers have yellow petals.

Distribution and habitat
Melhania volleseniana is native to Ethiopia, Kenya and Somalia. The species is only known from about 15 sites.

References

volleseniana
Flora of Ethiopia
Flora of Kenya
Flora of Somalia
Plants described in 2007